Sachin Chaudhari (born 27 March 1986) is an Indian first-class cricketer who plays for Maharashtra.

References

External links
 

1986 births
Living people
Indian cricketers
Maharashtra cricketers
Cricketers from Nagpur